Daniel Agina (born in Nairobi) is Kenyan football defender.

Career
Agina went to Jamhuri High School in Nairobi. He played in the Kenyan Premier League for Tusker FC helping them claim 2 league championships and 2 East and Central African Championships.

He was also a key player when Kenya won the Castle Lager Cup in Dar es Salaam and also came second to Uganda in Nairobi.

He later moved to the US on soccer scholarship where he helped Southern Nazarene University go to 4 consecutive national tournaments. He graduated in 2007. He is the all-time leader in assists in the school's history. He was selected for the 2006 NAIA Men's Soccer All-American teams

International career
He has played for the Kenya national football team.

References

External links
 

Living people
Footballers from Nairobi
Kenyan footballers
Kenya international footballers
Year of birth missing (living people)
Southern Nazarene University alumni
Southern Nazarene Crimson Storm men's soccer players
Tusker F.C. players
Alumni of Jamhuri High School

Association football defenders